Leonard Thomas "Len" Devine (14 October 1923 – 29 May 2008) was an Australian politician.

Raised and educated in Sydney he was the Health Inspector for Sydney City Council before serving in World War II from 1942 to 1945. On his return he became a taxi-driver and alderman on Sydney City Council. In 1963, he was elected to the Australian House of Representatives as the Labor member for East Sydney. Devine held the seat until its abolition in 1969, when he retired.
He died in 2008.

References

Australian Labor Party members of the Parliament of Australia
Australian people of Irish descent
Members of the Australian House of Representatives for East Sydney
Members of the Australian House of Representatives
1923 births
2008 deaths
20th-century Australian politicians